A Thousand Miles Left Behind is the second studio album by American country music band Gloriana. It was released on July 31, 2012 via Emblem Music Group/Warner Bros. Records.

Content
It is their first album since the departure of band member Cheyenne Kimball in 2011. According to group member Tom Gossin, the album was completed before Kimball's departure, but the songs (including "Wanna Take You Home") were then re-recorded without her. A song that Kimball wrote (called "Piece of My Heart") was also removed from the track list.

The trio had a hand in writing all of the album's eleven tracks. Three singles have been released from the project, including the group's first top five song, "(Kissed You) Good Night."

Commercial performance
A Thousand Miles Left Behind debuted at No. 2 on Country Albums, and No. 11 on Billboard 200, selling 23,000 copies in its first week.  It has sold 118,000 copies in the US as of May 2015.

Track listing

Personnel

Gloriana
Mike Gossin- electric guitar, vocals
Tom Gossin- acoustic guitar, programming, vocals
Rachel Reinert- vocals

Additional musicians
Alex Arias- choir 
Pat Bergeson- harmonica
Tom Bukovac- dobro, acoustic guitar, electric guitar
Eric Darken- percussion
Dan Dugmore- dobro, pedal steel guitar
Shannon Forrest- drums
Aubrey Haynie- fiddle, mandolin
Ryan Kern- choir
Mike Leisz- choir
Jerry McPherson- electric guitar
Tim Pierce- acoustic guitar, electric guitar
Matt Serletic- Fender Rhodes, Hammond B-3 organ, keyboards, percussion, piano, programming, Wurlitzer
Jimmie Lee Sloas- bass guitar
Ilya Toshinsky- banjo, dulcimer, acoustic guitar, mandolin
Doug Trantow- choir

Chart performance

Album

End of year charts

Singles

References

2012 albums
Gloriana (band) albums
Warner Records albums
Albums produced by Matt Serletic